Electronic Temperature Instruments Limited (ETI) is a worldwide manufacturer and distributor of thermometers and portable test and measurement instrumentation. ETI supplies catering, industrial, HVAC, wireless, legionnaires, refrigeration thermometers and environmental monitoring instruments to various industries. These include food production, chemical, pharmaceutical and construction services.

History
The company was founded in 1983 in Worthing, West Sussex on the south coast of England. The company has been privately owned since inception.

ETI has been granted The Queen's Award for Industry for International Trade three times: in 2012, 2014, and 2017, and the Queen’s Award for Enterprise for Innovation in 2018.

Impact and scope
As of April 2017, the Easting Close factory is accredited for a number of equipment calibration activities.

References

Heating, ventilation, and air conditioning companies
Electronics companies of the United Kingdom
British companies established in 1983
British brands